Radek Štěpánek was the defending champion but chose not to participate.

David Goffin won his 4th title of the year, defeating compatriot Steve Darcis in the final 6–3,     6–3.

Seeds

  David Goffin (champion)
  Igor Sijsling (second round)
  Jiří Veselý (semifinals)
  Thomaz Bellucci (second round)
  Dudi Sela (first round)
  Paul-Henri Mathieu (withdrew)
  Andreas Haider-Maurer (second round)
  Dustin Brown (second round)
  Tobias Kamke (quarterfinals)

Draw

Finals

Top half

Bottom half

References
 Main draw
 Qualifying draw

Ethias Trophy - Singles
Singles